The Estrup cabinet was the government of Denmark from 11 June 1875 to 7 August 1894. It replaced the Fonnesbech Cabinet and was succeeded by the Reedtz-Thott Cabinet on 7 August 1894. It is the longest sitting government in Danish history.

List of ministers and portfolios
Some of the terms in the table begin end after 7 August 1894 because the minister was in the Reedtz-Thott cabinet as well.

References

1848 establishments in Denmark
1851 disestablishments
Moltke 2